Gerrard Sheppard (born November 16, 1990) is an American football wide receiver who is currently a free agent. He played college football at Towson.

Early years
He attended McDonogh High School. He was named to the first-team All-Metro team in his senior year in high school. He also named to the first-team All-State team.

College career
He played only eight games at Connecticut in 2010 and played in the Tostito’s Fiesta Bowl against the Oklahoma Sooners.

He then transferred to Towson, where he played in every game in 2011 season as a backup wide receiver and was the team's third leading receiver for the season.

Professional career
On April 27, 2013, he signed with the Baltimore Ravens as an undrafted free agent. On August 25, 2013, he was waived by the Ravens but was later added to their practice squad on September 2.

In 2019, Sheppard joined the Memphis Express of the Alliance of American Football, but failed to make the final roster. He was re-signed on February 13, 2019. The league ceased operations in April 2019.

Personal life
In 2017, Sheppard and his sister Shanae launched Sunset Raw Juice Bar, which has locations in Owings Mills and Fulton.

Sheppard is a vegetarian.

References

External links
Towson bio

1990 births
Living people
American football wide receivers
American players of Canadian football
Baltimore Ravens players
Canadian football wide receivers
UConn Huskies football players
Green Bay Packers players
Memphis Express (American football) players
People from Owings Mills, Maryland
Players of American football from Maryland
Sportspeople from Baltimore County, Maryland
Towson Tigers football players
Winnipeg Blue Bombers players